Humphrey-Weidman is a modern dance technique consisting of "fall" and "recovery" (losing and regaining equilibrium) that was invented by Doris Humphrey and Charles Weidman. In 1928 Humphrey and Weidman founded a dance school to teach their technique and a dance company to perform it; both were disbanded by Humphrey in the 1940s.

See also
 Eleanor King

Notes

References
Humphrey, Doris (1958) The art of making dances, New York:Rinehart (New York:Grove Weidenfeld, 1991 )

Dance in New York City
Dance technique